Bandbudh Aur Budbak  is an Indian animated comedy television series produced by Aashish Mall, Mayank Patel and Avinash Walzade. It was also produced by Paperboat Animation Studios. It premiered originally on ZeeQ in 2015. It showcases the antics and school life of two naughty friends named Badrinath and Buddhadev.

Characters

Main
 Badrinath "Badri": Badrinath is one of the main character of the show. He is the smarter one who thinks ideas to fail others in the things which he wants. He is loyal in his friendship and dislikes studying and going to school. He mostly plays the Mega Robot video game. He is voiced by Pooja Punjabi.

 Budhdeb "Budh": Budhdeb is one of the main character of the show. Budhdeb is also loyal in his friendship and dislikes studying and going to school. He always utters Ekdum Lallantaap. Even Badrinath sometimes utters this phrase. Like Badrinath, he also mostly plays Mega Robot. He is voiced by Sonal Kaushal.

Recurring
 Jeeva: Jeeva is the fattest boy in the class. He stutters. He considers himself very powerful but actually, he is a cowardly boy.

 Gyan Singh: Gyan is the most intelligent student of the class and is from Punjab, India. Always, he gets first position in the class.

 Sabina: Sabina is the monitor of the class. She is from Gujarat. She is very responsible and wears glasses. She is Gyan's friend.

 Karan: Karan is a very stylish boy. He is from United States and always boasts about things which his father brings for him from foreign countries (mainly from United States and London).

 Maira & Saira: Sisters Maira and Saira are the pretty girls of the school. They are very stylish and most of the times speak English. They love to talk about movies and often talk about them when they walk in the school corridors.

 Mukesh, Ganesh & Ramesh: Brothers Mukesh, Ganesh & Ramesh are in triplets. All of them wear glasses.

 Dubey: Dubey Ji is the class teacher of Badri and Budh's class. He speaks Awadhi and sometimes speaks some English phrases too. He is fat and always punishes Badrinath and Budhdeb by making them murga whenever they act badly in school.

 Makkhan Singh Rathi: Makkhan Singh Rathi is the principal of Apna School. He is from Haryana and speaks Haryanvi and sometimes uses English for official communication. He has a tall and thin frame. He loves trophies and urges students to get trophies for the school. He comes to school by a yellow-coloured car. His catchphrase is Aakhir Principal Hai Hum.

 Bindiya Roy: Bindiya Roy is the art teacher of the school. She is from West Bengal and speaks out some Bengali when she speaks Hindi or English. She wears glasses. She often says Khub Bhalo.

 Patel: Patel is the peon of the school. He is quite lazy. He is from Gujarat and speaks Gujarati. Sometimes, he even speaks Sanskrit.

 Patil: Patil is the security guard of the school. He is sincere and responsible. He is quite active. He is from Maharashtra and speaks Marathi.

 Yogiraj Ji: Yogiraj Ji also known as Yoginath Ji is the yoga teacher of Apna School. He has long hair and beard.

 Krishnan Sir: Krishnan Sir is the lab assistant of Apna School. He is sincere, intelligent and responsible. He wears glasses. He is from Kerala.

 Librarian: She is an anonymous female teacher. She is in charge of the library and teaches Hindi to the class, as shown in episode Angrezi Ka Aakraman. Her name is not mentioned

 Cinderella: Cinderella is a buffalo. She debuted in the episode "Cinderella Story". Both Badrinath and Budhdeb often bump onto her when they don't ride their cycle carefully, but she doesn't react in any way to them.

Episodes

Broadcast
The show was originally released on ZeeQ on 13 February 2015. Later, it aired on Discovery Kids from February 2018 to 2019. It also aired on the channels Zee Anmol and Big Magic. From 18 April 2020, it was telecasted on Cartoon Network.

See also
 List of Indian animated television series
 Pyaar Mohabbat Happy Lucky
 Chimpoo Simpoo
 List of Bandbudh Aur Budbak episodes

References

2015 Indian television series debuts
2017 Indian television series endings
Indian children's animated comedy television series
Discovery Kids (Indian TV channel) original programming